The states and territories included in the United States Census Bureau's statistics for the United States population, ethnicity, religion, and most other categories include the 50 states and Washington, D.C.. Separate statistics are maintained for the five permanently inhabited territories of the United States: Puerto Rico, Guam, the U.S. Virgin Islands, American Samoa, and the Northern Mariana Islands.

Method
The United States Census counts the persons residing in the United States including citizens, non-citizen permanent residents and non-citizen long-term visitors. Civilian and military federal employees serving abroad and their dependents are counted in their home state.

Electoral apportionment
Every 10 years, the U.S. Census Bureau is charged with making an actual count of all residents by state and territory.  The accuracy of this count is then tested after the fact, and sometimes statistically significant undercounts or overcounts occur.  For example for the 2020 decennial census, 14 states had significant miscounts ranging from 1.5% to 6.6%.  While these adjustments may be reflected in government programs over the following decade, the 10-year representative apportionments discussed below are not changed to reflect the miscount.

House of Representatives 
Based on this decennial census, each state is allocated a portion of the 435 fixed seats in the United States House of Representatives (until the early 20th century, the apportionment process generally increased the size of the House based on the results of the census until the size of the House was capped by the Reapportionment Act of 1929), with each state guaranteed at least one Representative. The allocation is based on each state's proportion of the combined population of the fifty states (not including the District of Columbia, Guam, American Samoa, the Northern Mariana Islands, Puerto Rico, or the United States Virgin Islands).

Electoral College 
The Electoral College, every four years, elects the President and Vice President of the United States based on the popular vote in each state and the District of Columbia. Each state's number of votes in the Electoral College is equal to its number of members in the Senate plus members in the House of Representatives.

The Twenty-third Amendment to the United States Constitution additionally grants the District of Columbia (D.C.), which is not part of any state, as many Electoral College votes as it would have if it were a state, while having no more votes than the least populous state (currently, Wyoming). Since the U.S. Constitution guarantees every state at least one member of the U.S. House of Representatives and two members of the U.S. Senate, every state has at least three Electoral College votes. Thus, the Electoral College has 538 members (100 senators, plus 435 representatives due to the arbitrary limit imposed by the Reapportionment Act of 1929, plus 3 members for the District of Columbia). Territories of the United States such as Puerto Rico are not included in the Electoral College: people in those territories cannot vote directly for the President of the United States, although they may participate in the partisan nominating primaries and caucuses.

State and territory rankings
Column header abbreviations:
 Abs. = Absolute, elec. = electoral, Elec. Coll. = Electoral College

* — non-voting member of the House of Representatives.

Summary of population by region

Column header abbreviations: # = Rank, Geo. = Geographic

See also

Demographics of the United States
List of U.S. states and territories by area
List of U.S. states and territories by net migration
List of U.S. states and territories by race/ethnicity
List of U.S. states by African-American population
List of U.S. states by historical population (tables of state populations since 1790)
List of U.S. states by population density
List of U.S. states by religiosity
List of U.S. states by vehicles per capita
List of United States cities by population

Notes

References
General

 
 
 
 Statistical Abstract of the United States, 1995, U.S. Census Bureau, Section 29: Outlying Areas, Table No. 1347. Land Area and Population Characteristics, by [Outlying] Area: 1990 (page 828). Retrieved May 28, 2011
Specific

External links
United States Government
United States Census Bureau
USCB population estimates
United States Office of Management and Budget

United States States And Territories By Population
Population
Lists of subdivisions of the United States
United States demography-related lists
United States geography-related lists
United States, population